The Aerojet Rocketdyne RS-68 (Rocket System 68) is a liquid-fuel rocket engine that uses liquid hydrogen (LH2) and liquid oxygen (LOX) as propellants in a gas-generator power cycle. It is the largest hydrogen-fueled rocket engine ever flown.

Its development started in the 1990s with the goal of producing a simpler, less-costly, heavy-lift engine for the Delta IV launch system. Two versions of the engine have been produced: the original RS-68 and the improved RS-68A. A third version, the RS-68B, was planned for the National Aeronautics and Space Administration's (NASA) Ares V rocket before cancellation of the rocket and the Constellation Program altogether.

Design and development

One of the main goals of the RS-68 program was to produce a simple engine that would be cost-effective when used for a single launch. To achieve this, the RS-68 has 80% fewer parts than the multi-launch Space Shuttle Main Engine (SSME). The adverse consequences of this simplicity were a significantly lower thrust-to-weight ratio and a 10% lower specific impulse compared to the SSME. The benefit of this simplicity is the RS-68's reduced construction cost.

 The RS-68 was certified in December 2001 for use on Delta IV rockets.

An RS-68 is part of each Delta IV Common Booster Core. The largest of the launch vehicles, the Delta IV Heavy, uses three CBCs mounted together.

The RS-68 is gimbaled hydraulically and is capable of throttling between 58% and 102% thrust.

The first launch on June 29, 2012, from the Cape Canaveral Air Force Station used three RS-68A engines mounted in a Delta IV Heavy rocket.

Proposed uses

In 2006, NASA announced an intention to use five RS-68 engines instead of SSMEs on the planned Ares V. NASA chose the RS-68 because of its lower cost, about $20 million per engine including the cost of NASA's upgrades. The upgrades included a different ablative nozzle to accommodate a longer burn, a shorter start sequence, hardware changes to limit free hydrogen at ignition, and a reduction in the amount of helium used during countdown and flight. Thrust and specific impulse increases would occur under a separate upgrade program for the Delta IV rocket. Later, the Ares V was changed to use six RS-68 engines, designated the RS-68B. Ares V was dropped as part of the cancellation of the Constellation program in 2010. NASA's current successor heavy-lift vehicle, the Space Launch System, uses four RS-25 engines instead.

Human-rating

In 2008, it was reported that the RS-68 needs over 200 changes to receive a human-rating certification. NASA has stated that those changes include health monitoring, removal of the fuel-rich environment at liftoff, and improving the robustness of its subsystems.

Variants
 RS-68 is the original version. It produces  thrust at sea level.
 RS-68A is an improved version. It produces  thrust at sea level and  thrust in a vacuum. 
 RS-68B was a proposed upgrade to be used in the Ares V launch vehicle for NASA's Constellation program. The Ares V was to use six RS-68B engines on a  diameter core stage, along with two 5.5-segment solid rocket boosters. It was later determined that the ablative nozzle of the RS-68 was poorly suited to this multi-engine environment, causing reduced engine efficiency and extreme heating at the base of the vehicle.

See also
 Comparison of orbital rocket engines
 M-1 (rocket engine)
 National Launch System
 Rocketdyne J-2
 RS-83
 Space Launch Initiative
 TR-106

References

External links

Aerojet Rocketdyne's RS-68 page
RS-68 page on Astronautix.com

Rocket engines using hydrogen propellant
Rocketdyne engines
Rocket engines using the gas-generator cycle
Rocket engines of the United States